The Portuguese-class trawlers of World War II were naval trawlers, built in Portugal for the Royal Navy.

These vessels were built in several Portuguese yards, and offered by Portugal to the Royal Navy. This aid to the British war effort solicited protests by Nazi Germany, since, officially, Portugal was a neutral country.

After the war the ships were sold, most of them becoming mercantile vessels, some under the Portuguese flag. The former HMT Product went to the Royal Hellenic Navy.

Ships in class
  – Launched 1942, mercantile vessel Sjostkerk 1964
  – Launched 1942, sold 1946
  – Launched 1942, mercantile vessel Portrush 1946, Property 1947 and Vaagness 1955
  – Launched 1942, sold 1946
  – Launched 1941, sold 1946
  – Launched 1943, sold 1946
  – Launched 1942, mercantile vessel Pólo Norte 1946
  – Launched 1942, mercantile vessel Arrábida 1946
  – Launched 1941, sold 1946
  – Launched 1941, minesweeper repair ship 1943, Greek Navy Hermes 1946
  – Launched 1942, mercantile vessel Algenib 1946
  – Launched 1941, mercantile vessel Aldebaran 1946

See also
 
 
 
 Trawlers of the Royal Navy

References
 Naval Trawlers
 P class (uboat.net)

Mine warfare vessel classes
Naval ships of Portugal
Naval trawlers of the United Kingdom
Patrol vessels of the Hellenic Navy
Patrol vessels of the Royal Navy
Ship classes of the Royal Navy
Ships built in Portugal